EB-1 or EB1 may refer to:
EB-1 visa, a U.S. immigrant visa preference category
Gibson EB-1, an electric bass guitar 
EB1, a Honda E engine
Ford Falcon (EB) Series I, a car
Higgins EB-1, an American helicopter 
Bazzocchi EB.1 Littore, a glider
British Rail Class EB1, locomotives
EB1 (end-binding 1), or MAPRE1, a protein
(180537) 2004 EB1, a minor planet

See also
EBI (disambiguation)
EB-2 (disambiguation) 
BZLF1, also known as Zta, EB1, a viral gene of the Epstein–Barr virus